Saint Stephens is an unincorporated community in Nuckolls County, Nebraska, United States.

History
A post office called Saint Stephen operated between 1881 and 1887. It was one of the first post offices established in Nuckolls County.

References

Unincorporated communities in Nuckolls County, Nebraska
Unincorporated communities in Nebraska